A'arab Zaraq – Lucid Dreaming is the sixth full-length musical album by Swedish symphonic metal band Therion released in the year that the band celebrated their tenth anniversary. The record contains a few unused songs from Theli, a few cover songs the band had made, plus a full soundtrack Christofer Johnsson had made independently for the film called The Golden Embrace.

Track listing

Credits
Christofer Johnsson – guitar, bass guitar, keyboards, Hammond organ, grand piano
Piotr Wawrzeniuk – drums, Vocals
Jonas Mellberg – guitar, keyboards ("In Remembrance")
Lars Rosenberg – bass guitar

Guest musicians
Dan Swanö – vocals ("In Remembrance", "Black Fairy")
Tobias Sidegard – vocals ("Under Jolly Roger")
Peter Tägtgren – second and fourth lead guitar ("Under Jolly Roger")
Gottfried Koch – acoustic guitar ("Here Comes the Tears", "Up to Netzach"), grand piano

Choir and solo opera
 Bettina Stumm – soprano
 Raphaela Mayhaus – soprano
 Marie-Therese Kubel – alto
 Ergin Onat – tenor
 Klaus Bulow – bass
 Joachim Gebhardt – bass

Cover design
Art, design, photo and layout are made by Peter Grøn.

Charts

References

External links
 
 
 Information  about album at the official website

Film soundtracks
1997 soundtrack albums
Therion (band) soundtracks
Nuclear Blast soundtracks
Albums produced by Peter Tägtgren